The Grotta di Matromania (or Mitromania or Matrimonio) is a large, natural cave on the east coast of the island of Capri, Italy.  It is located near the Arco Naturale. The cave is approximately 27 m long, 18 m wide, and 18 m high. It is connected with Mithras.

References

Capri, Campania
Matromania